Schell Games is a game design and development company based in Pittsburgh, Pennsylvania. It was founded in 2002 by game developer Jesse Schell. Schell Games creates video games and interactive experiences for education and entertainment.

History 
Before founding Schell Games in 2002, Jesse Schell was the creative director of the Disney Imagineering Virtual Reality Studio. Since creating the studio, Jesse and Schell Games have worked with and created games for Google, Yale, Legendary, Fred Rogers Company and more.

Original games

Educational games 
Schell Games has designed and developed a number of serious games meant to change a player's behavior when they complete the game.

Entertainment Games 
Schell Games has designed and developed several experiences for partners for casual gaming and entertainment.

Location-based Experiences 
Schell Games also operates under "Schell Attractions", when the studio bids for projects dealing with location-based experiences and amusement parks.

References

External links
 

Video game development companies
Video game companies of the United States
American companies established in 2002
Video game companies established in 2002
Companies based in Pittsburgh
2002 establishments in Pennsylvania